John C. Turmel (born February 22, 1951) is a perennial candidate for election in Canada, and according to the Guinness World Records holds the records for the most elections contested and for the most elections lost, having contested 106 elections and lost 105. The other contest was a by-election that was pre-empted by a general election call.

Background
Turmel, who describes himself as a "Libertarian Socred", believes in Louis Even's Quebec social credit theory of monetary reform and has also campaigned for the legalization of gambling, the adoption of "Local Employment Trading Systems" (LETS) which are interest-free barter arrangements, and for the legalization of marijuana. He describes his platform as "I want no cops in gambling, sex or drugs or rock and roll, I want no usury on loans, pay cash or time, no dole."

He has participated in several protests outside of Canada's major banking institutions, saying that bank interest promotes poverty and starvation in the third world.

Turmel, an electrical engineering graduate, who lists his occupation as "professional gambler" was active in the Social Credit Party of Canada and the Social Credit Party of Ontario in the 1980s, and founded the Christian Credit Party in the 1980s, the Abolitionist Party of Canada in the 1990s, and the Pauper Party of Ontario in 2011.
He wears a white construction helmet, when campaigning,
and calls himself "The Engineer".
The colour of his helmet is said to not only refer to the white construction helmets worn by engineers and architects on construction sites, but also to the berets blanc (white berets), the nickname of the Pilgrims of Saint Michael, a radical monetarist faction within the Quebec social credit movement.

Turmel's grandfather, Adelard Turmel, supported the Social Credit Party of Canada from its inception in 1935, and he passed on a belief in social credit monetary theories to his descendants. His brother, Raymond Turmel, has also campaigned for public office on several occasions.

Turmel spent most of his life in Ottawa but has made Brantford, Ontario, his home since 2003 after running in a by-election there and finding he liked the area where he could play high-stakes Holdem Poker professionally at the Brantford Charity Casino.

Political activity

Gambling activism
Turmel received a bachelor's degree in electrical engineering from Carleton University in Ottawa in 1976 with a specialization in the mathematics of gambling and became Teaching Assistant to Walter Schneider in the course until 1978 when he was fired for running a highly publicized Blackjack "21" game in the Faculty Club. The next year he received his first conviction for keeping a common gaming house for running Blackjack games at home. In 1981, Turmel was convicted and jailed for 21 days for keeping a gaming house and playing 21, he lost the appeal but had the sentence converted to 100 hours community service playing accordion in old-age homes. In 1991, Turmel was convicted in Gatineau, Quebec, of running a common gaming house and sentenced to 4 months in jail. Before getting out after one month, Turmel ran for Chair of Ottawa-Carleton Regional Municipality while in jail, collecting approximately 3,500 votes. In 1993, as a part of Project Robin Hood, Ottawa and Ontario Provincial Police raided the private 28-table Casino Turmel, the largest gaming house raid in Canadian history. Turmel was convicted and sentenced to 200 hours community service playing accordion in retirement homes.

Entering the electoral fray
His campaign to legalize gambling and the notoriety he received as a result, combined with his family's background in social credit ideology, led Turmel to seek election at the federal level for the first time at the age of 28, as an independent candidate in Ottawa West in the May 1979 federal election in which he ran as the self-described "champion of hookers, gamblers and dope smokers" in a campaign in which he argued interest on money, usury, was the evil instability in financial affairs and swore to "abolish interest rates". He won 193 votes.

Social Credit
He ran again as an independent in the February 1980 federal election in Ottawa Centre. His application to run as a Social Credit Party of Canada candidate was rejected by party leader Fabien Roy. He won 64 votes. The Social Credit Party lost its remaining seats in the election.

Because of the death of the Social Credit candidate in Frontenac riding in Quebec during the election, a by-election was held in March. When Fabien Roy accepted the nomination without a convention, Turmel ran again as an independent against the Social Credit candidate. He ran as an independent candidate in the April 13 federal by-election in London West, claiming to be interim leader of the Ontario Social Credit Party. Turmel won 77 votes as an "independent Social Credit" candidate in a September 8 by-election in Hamilton West.

He also sought the Social Credit Party of Canada’s interim national leadership unsuccessfully at a convention in November in Calgary. Turmel opposed the appointment of Martin Hattersley as interim leader of the federal Social Credit party as being undemocratic. The party executive claimed that the party did not have sufficient funds to hold a convention.

While running in the Hamilton West federal byelection, Turmel registered for Mayor of Ottawa in November, collecting 1,928 votes. At the same time, he ran as the Social Credit candidate in a provincial by-election in Carleton riding, coming in last. Registered in a hat-trick.

With grandfather Adelard, mother Therese, and brother Ray Turmel in support, Turmel started picketing the Bank of Canada on every Thursday when the interest rate was set and then picketing Parliament too. This continued for five years until the retirement of Governor Gerald Bouey.

In the March 1981 provincial election, Turmel ran as a Social Credit candidate in Ottawa Centre, while his brother Raymond ran for the party in Ottawa South and Serge Girard, Dale Alkerton and Andrew Dynowski ran in neighbouring ridings. It was reported that he became interim leader of the Ontario Social Credit Party in early March, although it is not clear if other members of the party agreed.

In September, Turmel was a candidate in the federal by-election in Spadina riding in Toronto, collecting 98 votes. The national Social Credit party president Carl O’Malley refused to endorse a candidate on the basis that the Liberal candidate, Jim Coutts, a former adviser to Pierre Trudeau, was a personal friend. Raymond Turmel ran as an independent against O’Malley in the by-election held in Joliette, Quebec on the same day, claiming to be the "real Social Credit" candidate.

In October, the Ontario Social Credit Party conducted a leadership vote. The eleven delegates, who represented about 100 party members throughout the province, elected former Toronto mayoral candidate Anne McBride as their new interim leader in a vote of 7 to 1 with 3 spoiled ballots. One vote was cast for Bruce Arnold. Turmel, his brother Ray and their mother, Therese, wrote the word "unconstitutional" across the ballots. Turmel argued that the party was violating its constitution by holding a vote without providing four months' notice to its members. McBride was a Christian fundamentalist minister who vowed to run the party "on Christian principles".

In September, Turmel was reported to be fighting his expulsion from the federal Social Credit Party, and seeking its leadership. Further, he was reported to be seeking to replace Joe Clark as leader of the Progressive Conservative Party of Canada. Turmel denied the report, but the journalist stood by her story.

Christian Credit Party
In June 1982, Turmel returned to Hamilton West to run in a provincial by-election as a candidate of the Christian Credit Party that he had recently founded. He won 173 votes.

The Christian Credit Party was formed after the Social Credit Party refused to renew the memberships of Turmel and his brother Raymond. The Turmel brothers said that they left the party because it had compromised its principles on interest rates.

He also ran for the Christian Credit Party in the September federal by-election in Broadview—Greenwood (in Toronto), winning an all-time low 16 votes. Raymond ran for the party in Leeds—Grenville in eastern Ontario.

In July, Turmel attempted to recruit members for his new party at the Social Credit national convention in Regina. In September, the party claimed to have 75 members.

In November 1982, Turmel ran for alderman in the Ottawa suburb of Gloucester, and appears to have abandoned an attempt to run in a provincial by-election in Toronto-York South though list #13 shows it was not abandoned. His brother, Raymond, ran for mayor of Gloucester, while their colleague Marc Gauvin ran for mayor of Ottawa.

By 1983, the Christian Credit Party appears to have died. Turmel said he disbanded his party because he realized voters would not give it a chance. "People won't vote for a new party. They've been voting for one colour all their lives. The only way to do anything is to get into a recognized party."

Turmel, with Therese and Ray, Marc and Emi Gauvin and Serge Girard picketed the 1983 Bilderberger conference held at Chateau Montebello.

Turmel ran as an independent candidate in the Central Nova (Nova Scotia) riding by-election in September 1983 against Progressive Conservative leader Brian Mulroney. He claimed to be a "member of the Abolitionist wing of the PC party".

Turmel won 97 votes as a candidate in a provincial by-election in Stormont—Dundas—South Glengarry, Ontario.

Green Party
In the months before the 1984 federal election, Turmel attempted to take over the Ottawa branch of the fledgling Green Party of Canada by signing up new members and seeking the party’s nomination in Ottawa Centre. After the party had appointed a candidate in Ottawa Centre rather than hold nominations, Turmel claimed that it was undemocratic and called a meeting at which all Greens were invited to elect candidates to run in various Ottawa area ridings under the Green Party banner. The party rejected those nominations, and then held its own meeting to nominate new candidates.

In the election, Turmel ran as an independent against Green Party leader Trevor Hancock in Toronto—Beaches, Marc Gauvin ran in Ottawa Centre, supporter Serge Girard in Ottawa—Vanier, and John and Ray’s mother, Therese Turmel ran in Ottawa West, and Ray Turmel ran as an "independent Green" in Nepean—Carleton.

Turmel ran as an independent candidate in the December 13, 1984, provincial by-election in Ottawa Centre, and Serge Girard ran in Ottawa East. Turmel also ran for mayor of Ottawa.

In 1985, the Executive of the Ontario Branch of the Green Party expelled Ontario member John Turmel and Quebec member Ray Turmel.

Mid to late 1980s
Also in 1985, Turmel appears to have founded the "Social Credit Party of Ontario", which was not affiliated with other social credit parties. Turmel led a campaign against the practice of cheque cashing agencies that cashed social assistance (SA, or welfare) cheques at a discount to the face value. Turmel issued ID card to SA recipients and recruited local retailers to cash the cheques at no discount. The Social Credit Party of Ontario guaranteed these cheques. In November, Turmel supporter Walter McPhee ran for Ottawa mayor and Turmel for Nepean mayor. This proved to be Turmel's best performance by percentage of the vote, as he collected 7.25% of the vote, as he was the only other candidate against mayor Ben Franklin.Turmel ran in an April 1986 provincial by-election in Toronto-York East and an August 14 provincial by-election in Cochrane, Ontario, apparently under the "Social Credit Party of Ontario" banner.

In September, he ran as an "independent créditiste" claiming to be the heir of Réal Caouette in a federal by-election in St.-Maurice, Quebec when Liberal MP Jean Chrétien resigned.

In June 1987, Turmel ran in a federal by-election in Hamilton Mountain. He was reported to be "attempting to form" an Ontario Social Credit Party.

In the autumn of 1988, Turmel ran for mayor of Ottawa, Member of Parliament for Ottawa Centre and Member of Provincial Parliament for Welland—Thorold in the Niagara peninsula in a November 3 provincial by-election.

Abolitionist Party
Turmel founded the Abolitionist Party of Canada, which nominated 80 candidates in the 1993 federal election, one more than the Green Party of Canada.

In 1994, Turmel won over 4,500 votes running for Chair of Ottawa-Carleton Regional Municipality, the largest number of votes in his career.

He won 46 votes as the Abolitionist Party candidate in the February 13, 1995, Ottawa—Vanier federal by-election.

In June 1996, Turmel ran under the Abolitionist Party banner in a Hamilton East federal by-election and lost.

Turmel won 4,126 votes (2.5% of the total) running for Chair of Ottawa-Carleton Regional Municipality in 1997, in which Bob Chiarelli defeated Peter Clark by 2,798 votes. Turmel won 214 votes as an independent candidate in Ottawa West—Nepean in the 1997 federal election. In September, Turmel won 201 votes as an independent candidate in Ottawa West in a provincial by-election.

Turmel ran for the board of the National Capital FreeNet after the previous board reduced the number of seats from 7 to 5. He came 6th, and argues he was cheated out of the only election he ever won.

Turmel first appeared in the 1997 Guinness Book of World Records for most elections contested at 41.

He ran as an "independent Abolitionist" in a September 14, 1998, federal by-election in Sherbrooke, Quebec.

In 1999, he won 106 votes as an Abolitionist Party candidate in a March federal by-election in Windsor—St. Clair, Ontario, which was more than the margin by which Liberal candidate Rick Limoges defeated Joe Comartin of the New Democratic Party.

Early 2000s
In 2000, Turmel ran as an independent candidate in the September Kings—Hants (Nova Scotia) federal by-election against Progressive Conservative leader Joe Clark. He won 89 votes as an independent candidate in Ottawa West—Nepean in the November federal election.

In the same year, he made a presentation to the United Nations on the interest-free UNILETS resulting in Millennium Declaration Resolution C6 to governments to use an alternative time-based currency to restructure the global financial architecture.

In 2002, Turmel attempted to run for the leadership of the Marijuana Party but the leadership election was called off after Turmel showed up to contest the election.

Turmel won 295 votes as an independent candidate in Brant riding in the 2003 October provincial election. His 56th campaign was for Mayor of Ottawa in the November 2003 municipal election, when he collected 1,166 votes.

He also tried to resurrect the Libertarian Party of Canada, but was prevented from doing so when former members re-registered the name first.

Turmel ran as an independent candidate and placed fifth with 120 votes in a May 13, 2004, provincial by-election in Hamilton East. He placed last of eight candidates as an independent candidate in the March 17, 2005, provincial by-election in Dufferin—Peel—Wellington—Grey and placed last in Brant riding with 213 votes in the 2006 federal election.

Turmel was convicted of drug possession in March 2006, resulting from a one-man protest on Parliament Hill in Ottawa three years earlier. Turmel had taken three kilograms of marijuana to the hill, and openly smoked a joint in front of politicians and security officials. He announced plans to appeal. The conviction was rendered on the same day as a provincial by-election in Nepean—Carleton, in which Turmel was a candidate.

In 2003, Turmel acted as a party to Hitzig v Canada, a civil suit instrumental in reforming the Marihuana Medical Access Regulations and the status of medical cannabis in Canada generally.

Turmel ran as an independent candidate in a 2008 by-election in the riding of Guelph.  On Monday, August 25, he disrupted a televised debate involving candidates from the four major political parties to which the other four candidates had not been invited to participate. He yelled out his objections so loudly that the moderator of the debate could not be heard. He was eventually removed from the venue, the River Run Centre, by the Guelph police. The by-election was pre-empted by a federal election call in which Turmel re-filed his candidacy for the same riding – he came in tenth out of eleven candidates receiving 58 votes.

On September 10, 2009, police were called after Turmel lost control and disrupted an all-candidates meeting during the provincial by-election in Ontario's St. Paul's riding. Angry at a moderator's rule which forced residents to direct their questions at 4 of 8 candidates, thus effectively limiting his opportunity to speak, Turmel lashed out and ran around the church hall shouting at debate panelists and audience members that he'd go back onstage when he could answer too. At one point, the debate had to pause as a group of attendees attempted a citizen's arrest. Turmel stated that he would "ruin everyone's night" because "mine was ruined".

Dragon's Den
On January 13, 2010, Turmel appeared on the CBC television show Dragons' Den pitching his Local exchange trading system scheme, asking the panel of entrepreneurs to invest $100,000 for a program which would use poker chips from a local casino as currency at local businesses in Brantford, Ontario. The "dragons" said they didn’t understand Turmel's presentation and mocked him. Kevin O'Leary told Turmel he should "burst into flames" and fellow dragon Jim Treliving told Turmel he was "blowing air up a dead horse's ass".  Turmel initiated a lawsuit against the CBC as a result of the program. His complaint was rejected by the Ontario Court of Appeal in July 2011. On December 8, 2011, the Supreme Court of Canada denied Turmel's subsequent request for leave to appeal. He continues to maintain that the show was a "smear job".

2011 federal election
After contesting every Canadian general election from 1979 to 2008, Turmel did not contest the 2011 federal election. He indicated, however, that he would be willing to serve as prime minister if offered the role by Canada's elected parliamentarians, as per William Aberhart's rise to the premiership of Alberta in 1935 if the Engineer's Dream Team of chosen other party candidates were elected.

Pauper Party
Turmel contested the 2011 Ontario provincial election as founder and leader of the newly formed Pauper Party of Ontario. stating "we want no cops in gambling, sex or drugs or rock and roll, we want no usury on loans, pay cash or time, no dole." Turmel has subsequently run in Ontario by-elections under the "Pauper" banner.

Recent by-elections
In 2012, Turmel again ran as an independent, this time in the March 19 federal by-election in Toronto—Danforth to choose a successor to Jack Layton. He ran on a campaign pushing for mass production of marijuana to fight cancers he says are coming from the "nuclear fallout that hit us from Fukushima".

On the provincial level, Turmel has continued to carry the banner of the Pauper Party of Ontario and ran in the August 1, 2013 by-election in Ottawa South to choose the successor to Dalton McGuinty placing last with 43 votes. He ran again as a Pauper candidate in the February 13, 2014 provincial by-election in Thornhill placing last with 49 votes. On September 1, 2016, he secured second-to-last place in the Scarborough—Rouge River provincial by-election by one vote over former Trillium Party candidate Ania Krosinska.

Turmel placed 6th out of 6 candidates in the 2020 York Centre federal by-election, earning just under 0.6% of the vote.

Vexatious litigation
Turmel has argued a number of actions in the Canadian Federal Court. In 2022, the federal government applied for "Vexations Litigants" Section 40 against Turmel, whichif grantedwould prevent him from introducing a new application to the Court unless he had a court order to allow it, according to CTV News' senior political correspondent, Glen McGregor.

Appearance before Parliament

On June 6, 2018, Turmel appeared as a witness before the Canadian House of Commons Standing Committee on Procedure and House Affairs regarding the Trudeau Government's proposed changes to the Canada Elections Act.

During his appearance Turmel argued for free and equal broadcasting time for all candidates and fair auditing rules for candidates with only minor campaign expenses.

He also discussed the time banking software "LETS", being arrested, and being invited to give speeches at the United Nations.

Election results

Footnotes

External links

"Record-setting political also-ran John Turmel takes his 99th crack at elected office CBC News Profile

Living people
Independent candidates in the 1979 Canadian federal election
Independent candidates in the 1980 Canadian federal election
Independent candidates in the 1984 Canadian federal election
Independent candidates in the 1988 Canadian federal election
Abolitionist Party of Canada candidates for the Canadian House of Commons
Candidates in the 1993 Canadian federal election
Independent candidates in the 1997 Canadian federal election
Independent candidates in the 2000 Canadian federal election
Independent candidates in the 2004 Canadian federal election
Independent candidates in the 2006 Canadian federal election
Leaders of political parties in Canada
Carleton University alumni
Canadian social crediters
People from Rouyn-Noranda
1951 births
Independent candidates in Ontario provincial elections
Canadian cannabis activists
Canadian gamblers